Shahab ol Din or Shahab od Din or Shahab ed Din may refer to:
 Shahab ol Din, Ardabil
 Shahab ol Din, Kurdistan
 Shahab ol Din, Mazandaran